Sydowiella depressula is a fungal plant pathogen infecting caneberries.

References

Fungal plant pathogens and diseases
Small fruit diseases
Fungi described in 1873